Rock the Kasbah is a 2015 American comedy film directed by Barry Levinson and written by Mitch Glazer. The film stars Bill Murray as a talent manager sent to Afghanistan for a USO tour, Kate Hudson as his partner in country, Bruce Willis as his armed protection and book client, and Leem Lubany as his musical discovery. Open Road Films released the film on October 23, 2015.

Plot
Richie Lanz, a has-been rock manager, takes his last remaining client on a USO tour of Afghanistan. When Richie finds himself in Kabul, abandoned, penniless and without his U.S. passport, he discovers a young Afghan girl named Salima with an extraordinary voice and manages to convince Producer of Afghan Star Daoud to put her through Afghanistan's version of American Idol.

The story is very freely adapted from the 2009 documentary Afghan Star, and was dedicated to one of the stars of that film, Setara Hussainzada.

Cast

 Bill Murray as Richie Lanz
 Kate Hudson as Merci
 Zooey Deschanel as Ronnie
 Danny McBride as Nick
 Scott Caan as Jake
 Leem Lubany as Salima
 Beejan Land as Daoud
 Eugenia Kuzmina as Gula
 Arian Moayed as Riza
 Bruce Willis as Bombay Brian
 Taylor Kinney as Private Barnes
 Glenn Fleshler as Army Warrant Office
 Sameer Ali Khan as Azam Ghol
 Fahim Fazli as Tariq
 Jonas Khan as Nizar
 Sarah Baker as Maureen

Production

The film was announced in September 2013. In February 2014, Open Road Films acquired the US distribution rights to the film. In March 2014, Shia LaBeouf, who had been cast in the film, dropped out. A few days later, Scott Caan replaced LaBeouf.  Principal photography and production began on June 2, 2014, and ended on July 30, 2014. It was filmed in Morocco

Release
On August 20, 2014, Open Road Films announced the film would be released on April 24, 2015. On May 13, 2015, the film's release date was pushed up from November 13, 2015, to October 23, 2015.

Box office
This film opened on October 23, 2015, alongside The Last Witch Hunter, Paranormal Activity: The Ghost Dimension, Jem and the Holograms, and the expanded release of Steve Jobs. In its opening weekend, the film was originally projected to gross $6 million from 2,012 theaters; however, after grossing $75,000 during its Thursday preview screenings ($60 per theater), projections were lowered to $4 million. The film grossed $529,000 on its first day, and opening weekend projections were again lowered to $1.6 million. In its opening weekend, the film grossed $1.5 million, finishing 13th at the box office. According to Box Office Mojo, the film had the fifth-worst opening of all-time for a film playing in 2,000+ theaters, grossing an average $731 per venue (fellow opener Jem and the Holograms had an even worse $570 average).

Reception
On Rotten Tomatoes, the film has an approval rating of 7% based on 123 reviews and an average rating of 3.38/10. The site's critical consensus reads, "The Shareef don't like Rock the Kasbah, and neither will viewers hoping for a film that manages to make effective use of Bill Murray's knack for playing lovably anarchic losers." On Metacritic, the film has a score of 29 out of 100 based on 35 critics, indicating "generally unfavorable reviews". On CinemaScore, audiences gave the film an average grade of "B−" on an A+ to F scale.

References

External links
 
 
 
 

2015 films
2015 comedy-drama films
American comedy-drama films
2010s English-language films
Films about music and musicians
Films set in Afghanistan
Shangri-La Entertainment films
Open Road Films films
Films directed by Barry Levinson
Films produced by Bill Block
Films scored by Marcelo Zarvos
Films with screenplays by Mitch Glazer
2015 comedy films
2015 drama films
2010s American films